John Johnstone Paterson (29 October 1886 - 29 January 1971) was a tai-pan of Jardine Matheson & Co. and a member of the Executive Council and Legislative Council of Hong Kong.

Biography
The eldest son of William Paterson, a former partner at Jardine Matheson & Co. in the 1870s and 1880s,
J. J. Paterson followed in his father's footsteps, becoming managing director of the firm in the 1930s. He also served as chairman of the Hongkong and Shanghai Banking Corporation on three occasions between 1932 and 1941.

Paterson was first appointed to the Legislative Council in April 1930 as a stand-in for B. D. F. Beith. Subsequently, he was re-appointed to two four-year-terms in 1934 and 1938. In April 1936, Paterson succeeded William Edward Leonard Shenton as a member of the Executive Council.

During his time in Hong Kong, Paterson served on a number of public bodies, including the Hong Kong Volunteer Defence Corps Advisory Committee, the Hong Kong Naval Volunteer Advisory Committee, the Authorized Architects' Committee, the Housing Commission and the Taxation Committee.

During the Battle of Hong Kong, he commandeered the Hong Kong Volunteer Defence Corps' Special Guard Company known as the Hugheseliers, after its founder A.W. Hughes. Many of the recruits were older British men who had fought in World War I and the Boer War. 
The company was tasked with defending the North Point Power Station and was one of the few to survive the Japanese attack. Paterson became a prisoner of war during the Japanese occupation of Hong Kong and was detained at Shamshuipo Camp and Argyle Street Camp.

After the war, J.J. Paterson settled in Nairobi, Kenya, where he died in 1971.

References

1886 births
1971 deaths
Jardine Matheson Group
Chairmen of HSBC
Hong Kong businesspeople
Hong Kong people of Scottish descent
Scottish expatriates in Hong Kong
Members of the Executive Council of Hong Kong
Members of the Legislative Council of Hong Kong
World War II prisoners of war held by Japan
British Army personnel of World War II
20th-century Scottish businesspeople
British people in British Hong Kong
British expatriates in Kenya